John Canton  (31 July 1718 – 22 March 1772) was a British physicist. He was born in Middle Street Stroud, Gloucestershire, to a weaver, John Canton (b. 1687) and Esther (née Davis). As a schoolboy, he became the first person to determine the latitude of Stroud, whilst making a sundial. The sundial caught the attention of many, including Dr Henry Miles, a Stroud-born Fellow of the Royal Society. Miles encouraged Canton to leave Gloucestershire to become a trainee teacher for Samuel Watkins, the headmaster of a Nonconformist school in Spital Square, London, with whom he ultimately entered into partnership.

In 1750 he read a paper before the Royal Society on a method of making artificial magnets, and was subsequently elected a Fellow of the society (FRS). In 1751 he was a recipient of the Copley Medal "On account of his communicating to the Society, and exhibiting before them, his curious method of making Artificial Magnets without the use of Natural ones." He was the first in England to verify Benjamin Franklin's hypothesis of the identity of lightning and electricity, and he made several important electrical discoveries.

In 1762 and 1764 he published experiments in refutation of the decision of the Florentine Academy, at that time generally accepted, that water is incompressible. In 1768 he described the preparation, by calcining oyster-shell with sulphur, of the phosphorescent material known as Canton's phosphorus. His investigations were carried on whilst he worked as a school teacher. He died in London aged 53 of dropsy.

He was the recipient of letters that formed the foundation for modern day Bayes' Theorem from Thomas Bayes, which were then published by the Royal Society. John Canton did not receive those letter directly from Bayes, but through an intermediary after the death of Thomas Bayes. Richard Price initially established the communication between Thomas Bayes and John Canton.

Canton is now mainly remembered for his work in electrostatics, particularly the invention of the pith ball electroscope, and his studies in atmospheric electricity. He is honoured with a blue plaque at the site of his old school in his hometown of Stroud.

References

External links

 
 

1718 births
1772 deaths
English physicists
Fellows of the Royal Society
Recipients of the Copley Medal
People from Stroud
Deaths from edema
18th-century English people
Enlightenment scientists